Wally Ardron (19 September 1918 – March, 1978) was a footballer born in  Swinton, West Riding of Yorkshire, and who played as a centre forward. He joined Rotherham United from Denaby United, and went on to score 98 Football League goals for Rotherham, either side of World War II.

He joined Nottingham Forest after his time at Rotherham. Ardron scored on his league debut for Nottingham Forest on 20 August 1949 in the 2-2 draw away to Brighton, also winning 2 champion leagues at his time there.
 He holds the record for scoring most Forest league goals in one season (36 in 1950–51)  and is their third highest goal scorer in all competitions.

Career statistics

References

1918 births
1978 deaths
Denaby United F.C. players
Nottingham Forest F.C. players
Rotherham United F.C. players
English Football League players
Association football forwards
People from Swinton, South Yorkshire
English footballers